The John Ash House is a building in Savannah, Georgia, United States. Standing at 114–116 West Hull Street, it is located in the northeastern residential block of Orleans Square and was built in 1817. Built as a home for John Ash, a farmer who became a judge and member of the first Alabama Senate, it is now part of the Savannah Historic District and is the oldest building in Orleans Square.

In a survey for Historic Savannah Foundation, Mary Lane Morrison found the building to be of significant status and rated as "exceptional." It was documented by the Historical American Building Survey in the mid-20th century, when its significance was noted due to being a "good example of Federal, Adamesque style."

See also 

 Buildings in Savannah Historic District
 John Ash House, Ashville, Alabama

References 

Houses in Savannah, Georgia
Houses completed in 1817
Orleans Square (Savannah) buildings
Savannah Historic District